Argiope appensa, also referred to as the Hawaiian garden spider or banana spider, is an orb-weaving spider belonging to the family Araneidae.

Distribution and habitat
This species occurs on several islands in the western Pacific Ocean, in Hawaii and from Taiwan, Australia, New Caledonia, New Guinea to Indonesia.

It has been introduced to all main islands of Hawaii. It inhabits a wide variety of habitats, from coasts to upland forests. During the rainy season from June to November, this species is common in sunny edge areas, such as along roadsides and cultivated area.

Description
This species shows an evident sexual dimorphism.

On Guam, where Argiope appensa is ubiquitous, it is frequently visited by Argyrodes argentatus, that  steals food from the host. Following the brown tree snake and the subsequent extinction or near-extinction of many of the island's small birds, spider populations on Guam exploded in response to decreasing predation and competition. Nature writer David Quammen has called Argiope appensa "almost certainly one of the larger species" which were encountered in vast numbers during his research trip to Guam for the book The Song of the Dodo.

Biology
Argiope appensa construct webs mainly in bushes, between branches, and in human constructions. The webs are rather large and show a white zig-zag silk decoration developed from one corner to the center of the web. These decorations, usually called stabilimenta, could be a warning device to prevent birds from inadvertently destroying the web.

Gallery

References

Walckenaer, C. A. (1842): Histoire naturelle des Insects. Aptères. Paris, 2: 1-549.

appensa
Spiders of Hawaii
Spiders of Oceania
Spiders described in 1841
Articles containing video clips